The Monticello Artillery (1862–1865) was a Confederate Army artillery battery during the American Civil War. The unit was also known as: Owen's Battery, or Howell's Battery.  Some post war records refer to the unit as the Drew Light Artillery because most original members were from Drew County, Arkansas.

Organization
Based on the earliest dates of enlistment, the battery was apparently "organized at Monticello, Drew County, Arkansas, on February 8, 1862." The battery is occasionally referred to as either the Drew Light Artillery or "Drew's Battery", based on the units association with Drew County, Arkansas, but these references only appear in post war pension records and other articles.

The battery was reorganized for the war on May 15, 1862.  In the first quarter of 1864, the battery was armed with five 6 pdr bronze smoothbores and one 3.3" rifle. In May 1864, armed with two 6 pdr smoothbores, one 3.3" rifle and one 12 pdr howitzer.

Service
The battery served east of the Mississippi River for most of the war. The Monticello Artillery was originally organized as a light artillery battery, but as of March 18, 1862, the unit was at Memphis, Tennessee without guns or equipment, but by May 1862 it was referred to as heavy artillery. In early April 1862 the battery was at Fort Pillow, above Memphis, and later that month the battery moved to Corinth, Mississippi. An order dated Office Chief of Artillery, Corinth, Mississippi, May 2, 1862, directed Captain Owens, commanding Heavy Artillery, to "report with your company to Major-General Hardee for duty with the siege guns of his command." The unit left Corinth a month later and moved to Okolona, Mississippi. By June 30, 1862, the unit was at Columbus, Mississippi  On August 29, 1862, the unit is mentioned as part of the Heavy Artillery at Columbus. Altogether the unit would spend almost a year assigned to Columbus.

The unit had apparently reverted to light artillery by January 1, 1863, when General Daniel Ruggles reported:.

By June 30, 1863, the battery had moved back to Okolona, Mississippi.  On November 20, 1863, the battery was assigned to Brigadier General Samuel W. Ferguson's cavalry brigade of General Joseph E. Johnston's Department of Mississippi and East Louisiana.

On January 1, 1864, the battery is included in a list of light batteries assigned to the Army of the West, commanded by General Leonidas Polk and is listed as being armed with five 6 lb bronze guns and one 3.3 inch bronze gun. The unit was assigned to Furguson's Brigade of General Nathan Bedford Forrest's Division.  The unit is mentioned in Ed Bearss three volume set of the Vicksburg campaign. It appears to have been part of the Confederate forces opposing Sherman's Meridan Campaign in early 1864 and it is mentioned in Margie Bearss' book "Sherman's Forgotten Campaign". The unit was criticized by Major General Polk in February 1864 during the Meridian Campaign for failing to properly care for its horses, resulting in the need for replacements.

In the spring of 1864 the battery was assigned to a cavalry brigade commanded by Confederate General Wirt Adams which was operating in the Big Black and Yazoo Country of Mississippi.  While assigned to Adam's Brigade, along with another Arkansas unit, the famed, 11th / 17th Arkansas Mounted Infantry, the battery participated in the capture of the gun boat USS Petrel on April 23, 1864.  Major B.P. Jett of the 11th / 17th Arkansas described the battery's part in this action (Jett mistakenly refers to the unit as Drew's Battery):

 On May 15, 1864 Brigadier General Wirt Adams reported that two of Owen's guns were disabled and two more were "worthless". The unit is reported as being assigned to Adam's Division of the Department of Alabama, Mississippi and East Louisiana on June 1, 1864. Based on the unit's forage (feed) requisitions, the unit was stationed at Selma, Alabama during June 1864, and while at Selma, on June 14, 1864, the Captain Owens signed for equipment including:

Then unit seems to have settled in at Spanish Fort (Mobile), Alabama, as siege artillery by the summer of 1864. and remained there until the end of the war. The unit was initially assigned to Brigadier General St. John R. Lindell's Brigade of Major General Dabney H. Maury's District of the Gulf.
By November 1, 1864, the battery was under the command of Captain William C. Howell. Eventually the battery was placed in an organization commanded by Colonel Isaac W. Patton
and assigned to Redoubt No. 2, (also known as "Fort McDermont") of a line of Confederate works as Spanish Fort where they, along with the 22nd Louisiana and Massenburg's Georgia Light Artillery manned a Brooke Rifle, six smoothbore rifles, two twenty-four pound howitzers and six mortars. The unit participated in the Battle of Spanish Fort, part of the Mobile Campaign, in April 1865. Union forces embarked on a land campaign in early 1865 to take Mobile from the east. Maj. Gen. E.R.S. Canby's XIII and XVI corps moved along the eastern shore of Mobile Bay forcing the Confederates back into their defenses. Union forces concentrated first on Spanish Fort, five miles to the north. On March 27, 1865, Canby's forces undertook a siege of Spanish Fort, which consisted of a semi-circular line of five redoubts stretching almost two miles long. The Union had enveloped the fort by April 1, and on April 8 captured it. Most of the Confederate forces, including the remnants of the Monticello Artillery escaped and fled to Mobile.

The fall of Fort Blakely on April 9, 1865 signaled to Confederate General Dabney H. Maury in Mobile that it was time to begin evacuation of the remaining Confederate troops in the city. On April 12, 1865, Mobile was declared an open city and the remaining Confederate garrison retreated with the intention of joining the remains of the Army of Tennessee, then in North Carolina. The surrender of the Army of Tennessee to General Sherman on April 26, 1865 prevented that option and surrender of the Mobile garrison soon followed.  This small force out of Mobile, including the remnants of the Monticello Artillery, was the last Confederate army to surrender east of the Mississippi River.

Surrender
Stewart Sikakis claims that the unit re-crossed the Mississippi River in 1865 and surrendered in the Department of the Trans-Mississippi on May 26, 1865, although this appears to be an error. There are reports and correspondence in the Official Records of the American Civil War which place Owens' Arkansas Battery at Spanish Fort (Mobile), Alabama, until just before the end of the war. The battery was among the last Confederate troops east of the Mississippi River to surrender on May 10, 1865, at Meridian, Mississippi.  The Compiled Service Records of the unit members confirm that most of the men were paroled at Meridian, Mississippi, on May 10, 1865. Affidavits submitted by many former unit members in their post war pension applications confirm that the paroles took place at Meridian.

See also

 List of Arkansas Civil War Confederate units
 Lists of American Civil War Regiments by State
 Confederate Units by State
 Arkansas in the American Civil War
 Arkansas Militia in the Civil War

Notes

References
 
 United States. (1961). Compiled service records of Confederate soldiers who served in organizations from the State of Arkansas. Washington [D.C.: National Archives, National Archives and Records Service, General Services Administration.
 United States. (1998). Civil War Sites Advisory Commission report on the Nation's civil war battlefields: Technical volume II : battle summaries. Washington, DC: Civil War Sites Advisory Commission, c/o National Park Service.
 U.S. War Department, The War of the Rebellion: a Compilation of the Official Records of the Union and Confederate Armies, U.S. Government Printing Office, 1880–1901.
 Williams, C. M. (1951). The old town speaks: Washington, Hempstead County, Arkansas, gateway to Texas, 1835, Confederate capital, 1863. Houston, Tex: Anson Jones Press.
 Williamson, D. (2012). The 47th Indiana Volunteer Infantry: A Civil War history. Jefferson, N.C: McFarland & Co., Publishers.

External links
 Edward G. Gerdes Civil War Home Page
 The encyclopedia of Arkansas History and Culture
 The War of the Rebellion: a Compilation of the Official Records of the Union and Confederate Armies
 The Arkansas History Commission, State Archives, Civil War in Arkansas

Units and formations of the Confederate States Army from Arkansas
1865 disestablishments in Arkansas
Military units and formations disestablished in 1865
Military units and formations in Arkansas
Military in Arkansas
1862 establishments in Arkansas
Military units and formations established in 1862
Artillery units and formations of the American Civil War